James Sherman may refer to:

James S. Sherman (1855–1912), Vice President of the United States under President William Howard Taft, 1909–1912
James Sherman (comics), comic book artist
James Sherman (minister) (1796–1862), British Congregationalist and abolitionist
James Sherman (cricketer) (1791–1831), English cricketer
Jim Sherman (baseball) (born 1960), American college baseball coach and player

See also
James Shearman (born 1970), English composer